Hortensia is a common name for the flowering plant genus Hydrangea.

Hortensia may also refer to:

People
 Hortensia gens, an ancient plebeian family in Rome
 Hortensia (orator) (fl. 42 AD), a skilled orator, daughter of Quintus Hortensius Hortalus
 Hortensia Amaro (fl. from 1982), Cuban-American educator
 Hortensia Antommarchi (1850–1915), Colombian poet
 Hortensia Arzapalo (born 1981), Peruvian runner
 Hortensia Bussi (1914–2009), wife of Chilean President Salvador Allende
 Hortensia Aragón Castillo (born 1960), Mexican politician
 Hortensia Fussy (born 1954), Austrian sculptor
 Hortensia García (1930–2016), Mexican-American athlete
 Hortensia Herrero (born 1950), Spanish businesswoman
 Hortensia Mata (1849–1934), Ecuadorian businesswoman
 Hortensia von Moos (1659–1715), Swiss scholar
 Hortensia Papadat-Bengescu (1876–1955), Romanian novelist
 Hortensia Blanch Pita (1914–2004), Spanish writer
 Hortensia Soto (fl. from 2001), Mexican-American mathematics educator

Other uses 
 Hortensia (insect), a genus of sharpshooters in the tribe Cicadellini
 13116 Hortensia, a minor planet

See also 

 Hortensia diamond, part of the French Crown Jewels
 Lex Hortensia, a law passed in Ancient Rome in 287 BC
 Região das Hortênsias, a tourist destination in Brazil
 Villa Hortensia (Rosario), a mansion in Rosario, Argentina